New Hogan Dam is an embankment dam on the Calaveras River, a tributary of the San Joaquin River in central California. The dam lies east of Rancho Calaveras and impounds New Hogan Lake in the foothills of the Sierra Nevada. Built by the U.S. Army Corps of Engineers (USACE), the -high dam was completed in 1963. In 1986, the Modesto Irrigation District contracted with the USACE to build a base load hydroelectric plant at the dam with a capacity of 3.15 megawatts.

The original Hogan Dam was completed in September 1930 and named for Walter Byron Hogan -- a Stockton, California City Engineer and later City Manager.

See also
List of lakes in California
List of largest reservoirs of California
List of reservoirs and dams in California

References

Dams in California
Buildings and structures in Calaveras County, California
United States Army Corps of Engineers dams
Dams completed in 1963
Dams in the San Joaquin River basin